Saint Elmo or St. Elmo may refer to:

People
 Erasmus of Formia or Saint Elmo (died 303), patron saint of sailors
 Peter González or Saint Elmo (1190–1246), Castilian Dominican friar and priest
 St. Elmo Brady (1884–1966), first African American to obtain a Ph.D. in chemistry in the United States

Places

Malta 
 Fort Saint Elmo, a fortress in Valletta
 St. Elmo Bridge, a bridge located close to the above fort

United States 
 St. Elmo, Alabama
 St. Elmo, Colorado
 St. Elmo (Columbus, Georgia), a historic residence
 St. Elmo, Illinois
 St. Elmo, Louisiana, a community in Ascension Parish, Louisiana
 St. Elmo Historic District (Chattanooga, Tennessee)
 St. Elmo Steak House, a restaurant in Indianapolis, Indiana, U.S.

Fiction
 St. Elmo (novel), an 1866 novel by Augusta Jane Evans, which spawned numerous silent film adaptations:
 St. Elmo (1910 Thanhouser film)
 St. Elmo (1910 Vitagraph film)
 St. Elmo (1914 film)
 St. Elmo (1923 American film)
 St. Elmo (1923 British film)
 Saint Elmo (comics), a member of the Marvel Comics team Alpha Flight
 Saint Elmo – Hikari no Raihousha, an anime television special

Other uses
 St. Elmo (secret society), a senior secret society at Yale University
 St. Elmo Hall or Delta Phi Fraternity

See also 
 Ida Saint-Elme, pen name of Maria Verfelt (1776–1845), Dutch writer and actress
 Fort Saint-Elme (France), Collioure
 Sant'Elmo, a hill and a fortress in Naples, Italy
 Elmo (disambiguation)
 San Telmo (disambiguation)
 Santelmo, a creature of Philippine mythology
 St. Elmo's Fire (disambiguation)